Ebusco is a Dutch manufacturer of electric buses and accompanying charging infrastructure.

History  

Ebusco was founded in 2012 in Helmond. Here the workshop for two vehicles and the office were located in two different neighborhoods about 3 kilometers apart. This was the reason for moving to Deurne in September 2018, where the company has acquired a production hall of more than 7,000 m² and sufficient office space.

Since October 22, 2021, Ebusco has been listed on the Euronext in Amsterdam. Major shareholder is founder Bijvelds, after the IPO in October 2021 he held 35.4% of the shares and ING Group is number two with an equity interest of 21%.

Models
Ebusco 1.0 was produced in 2012. The buses were used for test drives in various European cities.

Ebusco 2.0 is a 12 m long low-floor bus. It was presented to the public for the first time at the IAA Commercial Vehicles 2014 in Hanover and has a battery with an energy content of 242 kWh. 

Ebusco 2.1 is also a 12 m long bus. The first vehicle was delivered in April 2017. Its battery has an energy content of 311 kWh. 

Ebusco 3.0 was presented at Busworld 2019, should be 33% lighter than its predecessor Ebusco 2.2 and drive up to 500 kilometres on battery charge. The Ebusco 3.0 is the first model to be built entirely in the Netherlands.

Awards 
 Automotive Innovation Award 2021
 JEC Composites Innovation Award: Automotive & Road Transportation Structural 2021
 Automotive Brand Contest (ABC) – German Design Council 2020
 Top 250 Scale ups – Erasmus 2020
 Busworld Innovation Label – Busworld 2019
 Busworld Ecology Label – Busworld 2015
 Busworld Ecology Label – Busworld 2013

References

External links

 

Bus manufacturers of the Netherlands
Electric vehicle manufacturers of the Netherlands
Deurne, Netherlands
2021 initial public offerings
Companies listed on Euronext Amsterdam